Pepper spray, oleoresin capsicum spray, OC spray, capsaicin spray, or capsicum spray is a inflammatory agent (a compound that irritates the eyes to cause a burning sensation, pain, and temporary blindness) used in policing, riot control, crowd control, and self-defense, including defense against dogs and bears.  Its inflammatory effects cause the eyes to close, temporarily taking away vision. This temporary blindness allows officers to more easily restrain subjects and permits people in danger to use pepper spray in self-defense for an opportunity to escape. It also causes temporary discomfort and burning of the lungs which causes shortness of breath.

Pepper spray was engineered into a spray originally for defense against bears, mountain lions, wolves and other dangerous predators, and is often referred to colloquially as bear spray.

Kamran Loghman, the person who developed it for use in riot control, wrote the guide for police departments on how it should be used. It was successfully adapted, except for improper usages such as when police sprayed peaceful protestors at University of California, Davis in 2011. Loghman commented, "I have never seen such an inappropriate and improper use of chemical agents", prompting court rulings completely barring its use on docile persons.

Components

The active ingredient in pepper spray is capsaicin, which is derived from the fruit of plants in the genus Capsicum, including chilis. Extraction of oleoresin capsicum (OC) from peppers requires capsicum to be finely ground, from which capsaicin is then extracted using an organic solvent such as ethanol. The solvent is then evaporated, and the remaining waxlike resin is the oleoresin capsaicin.

An emulsifier such as propylene glycol is used to suspend OC in water, and the suspension is then pressurized to make an aerosol pepper spray. Other sprays may use an alcohol (such as isopropyl alcohol) base for a more penetrating product, but a risk of fire is present if combined with a taser.

Determining the strength of pepper sprays made by different manufacturers can be confusing and difficult. Statements a company makes about their product strength are not regulated.
 The US federal government uses CRC (capsaicin and related capsaicinoids) content for regulation. CRC is the pain-producing component of the OC that produces the burning sensation. Personal pepper sprays can range from a low of 0.18% to a high of 3%. Most law enforcement pepper sprays use between 1.3% and 2%. The federal government of the United States has determined that bear attack deterrent sprays must contain at least 1.0% and not more than 2% CRC. Because the six different types of capsaicinoids under the CRC heading has different levels of potency (up to 2× on the SHU scale), the measurement does not fully represent the strength. Manufacturers do not state which particular type of capsaicinoids are used.
 Using the OC concentration is unreliable because the concentration of CRC (and potency of these compounds) can vary. Some manufacturers may show a very high percentage of OC, but the resin itself may not be spicy enough. Higher OC content only reliably implies a higher oil content, which may be undesirable as the hydrophobic oil is less able to soak and penetrate skin. Solutions of more than 5% OC may not spray properly.
 Scoville heat units (SHU) is a common indication of pepper spiciness. It does take into account the different potency of CRC compounds, but it cannot be reliably used in pepper spray because it measures the strength of the dry product, i.e. the OC resin and not what comes in the aerosol spray. As the resin is always diluted to make it spray-able, the SHU rating is not useful on its own.

Counterparts

There are several counterparts of pepper spray developed and legal to possess in some countries.
 In the United Kingdom, desmethyldihydrocapsaicin (known also as PAVA spray) is used by police officers. As a Section 5 weapon, it is not generally permitted to the public.
 Pelargonic acid morpholide (MPK) is widely used as a self-defense chemical agent spray in Russia, though its effectiveness compared to natural pepper spray is unclear.
 In China, Ministry of Public Security police units and security guards use tear gas ejectors with OC, CS or CN gases. These are defined as a "restricted" weapon that only police officers, as well as approved security, can use.

Effects

Pepper spray is an inflammatory agent. It inflames the mucous membranes in the eyes, nose, throat and lungs.  It causes immediate closing of the eyes, difficulty breathing, runny nose, and coughing. The duration of its effects depends on the strength of the spray; the average full effect lasts from 20 to 90 minutes, but eye irritation and redness can last for up to 24 hours.

The Journal of Investigative Ophthalmology and Visual Science published a study that concluded that single exposure of the eye to OC is harmless, but repeated exposure can result in long-lasting changes in corneal sensitivity. They found no lasting decrease in visual acuity.

The European Parliament Scientific and Technological Options Assessment (STOA) published in 1998 "An Appraisal of Technologies of Political Control"
The STOA appraisal states:

"Past experience has shown that to rely on manufacturers unsubstantiated claims about the absence of hazards is unwise. In the US, companies making crowd control weapons, (e.g. pepper-gas manufacturer Zarc International), have put their technical data in the public domain without loss of profitability."

and

"Research on chemical irritants should be published in open scientific journals before authorization for any usage is permitted and that the safety criteria for such chemicals should be treated as if they were drugs rather than riot control agents;"

For those taking drugs, or those subjected to restraining techniques that restrict the breathing passages, there is a risk of death. In 1995, the Los Angeles Times reported at least 61 deaths associated with police use of pepper spray since 1990 in the USA. The American Civil Liberties Union (ACLU) documented 27 people in police custody who died after exposure to pepper spray in California since 1993. However, the ACLU report counts all deaths occurring within hours of exposure to pepper spray regardless of prior interaction, taser use, or if drugs are involved. In all 27 cases listed by the ACLU, the coroners' report listed other factors as the primary cause of death; in a few cases the use of pepper spray may have been a contributing factor.

The US Army performed studies in 1993 at Aberdeen Proving Ground, and a UNC study in 2000 stated that the compound in peppers, capsaicin, is mildly mutagenic, and 10% of mice exposed to it developed cancer. Where the study also found many beneficial effects of capsaicin, the Occupational Safety and Health Administration released statements declaring exposure of employees to OC is an unnecessary health risk. As of 1999, it was in use by more than 2,000 public safety agencies.

The head of the FBI's Less-Than-Lethal Weapons Program at the time of the 1991 study, Special Agent Thomas W. W. Ward, was fired by the FBI and was sentenced to two months in prison for receiving payments from a pepper-gas manufacturer while conducting and authoring the FBI study that eventually approved pepper spray for FBI use.  Prosecutors said that from December 1989 through 1990, Ward received about $5,000 a month for a total of $57,500, from Luckey Police Products, a Fort Lauderdale, Florida-based company that was a major producer and supplier of pepper spray. The payments were paid through a Florida company owned by Ward's wife.

Direct close-range spray can cause more serious eye irritation by attacking the cornea with a concentrated stream of liquid (the so-called "hydraulic needle" effect). Some brands have addressed this problem by means of an elliptically cone-shaped spray pattern.

Pepper spray has been associated with positional asphyxiation of individuals in police custody. There is much debate over the actual cause of death in these cases. There have been few controlled clinical studies of the human health effects of pepper spray marketed for police use, and those studies are contradictory. Some studies have found no harmful effects beyond the effects described above.  Due to these studies and deaths, many law enforcement agencies have moved to include policies and training to prevent positional deaths.  However, there are some scientific studies that argue the positional asphyxiation claim is a myth due to pinpoint pressure on a person. The study by two universities stressed that no pressure should be applied to the neck area. They concluded that the person's own weight is not scientifically enough to stop a person's breathing with the rest of their body supported.

Acute response
For individuals not previously exposed to OC effects, the general feelings after being sprayed can be best likened to being "set alight". The initial reaction, should the spray be directed at the face, is the involuntary closing of the eyes, an instant sensation of the restriction of the airways and the general feeling of sudden and intense, searing pain about the face, nose, and throat. This is due to irritation of mucous membranes. Many people experience fear and are disoriented due to sudden restriction of vision even though it is temporary.  There is associated shortness of breath, although studies performed with asthmatics have not produced any asthma attacks in those individuals, and monitoring is still needed for the individuals after exposure. Police are trained to repeatedly instruct targets to breathe normally if they complain of difficulty, as the shock of the exposure can generate considerable panic as opposed to actual physical symptoms.

Treatment
Capsaicin is not soluble in water, and even large volumes of water will not wash it off, only dilute it. In general, victims are encouraged to blink vigorously in order to encourage tears, which will help flush the irritant from the eyes.

A study of five often-recommended treatments for skin pain (Maalox, 2% lidocaine gel, baby shampoo, milk, or water) concluded that: "...there was no significant difference in pain relief provided by five different treatment regimens. Time after exposure appeared to be the best predictor for a decrease in pain..."

There is no way to simply neutralize the effects of tear gas, but a person can be helped to minimize the effects. by moving away from the source and to fresh air. Many ambulance services and emergency departments carry saline to remove the spray. Some of the OC and CS will remain in the respiratory system, but a recovery of vision and the coordination of the eyes can be expected within 7 to 15 minutes.

Some "triple-action" pepper sprays also contain "tear gas" (CS gas), which can be neutralized with sodium metabisulfite (Campden tablets), though it is not for use on a person, only for area clean up.

Use
Pepper spray typically comes in canisters, which are often small enough to be carried or concealed in a pocket or purse. Pepper spray can also be purchased concealed in items such as rings. There are also pepper spray projectiles available, which can be fired from a paintball gun or similar platform. It has been used for years against demonstrators and aggressive animals like bears. There are also many types such as foam, gel, foggers, and spray.

Legality

Pepper spray is banned for use in war by Article I.5 of the Chemical Weapons Convention, which bans the use of all riot control agents in warfare whether lethal or less-than-lethal. Depending on the location, it may be legal to use for self-defense.

Africa 

 Nigeria: Assistant Police Commissioner stated that pepper sprays are illegal for civilians to possess.
 South Africa: Pepper sprays are legal to own by civilians for self defence.

Asia
 Bangladesh: 
 Bengal Police started using pepper spray to control opposition movement.
 China: Forbidden for civilians, it is used only by law enforcement agencies. Underground trade leads to some civilian self-defense use.
 Hong Kong: Forbidden for civilians, it is legal to possess and use only by the members of Disciplined Services when on duty. 
 Such devices are classified as "arms" under the "Laws of Hong Kong". Chap 238 Firearms and Ammunition Ordinance. Without a valid license from the Hong Kong Police Force, it is a crime to possess and can result in a fine of $100,000 and imprisonment for up to 14 years.
 India: Legal 
 They are sold via government-approved companies after performing a background verification.
 Indonesia: It is legal, but there are restrictions on its sale and possession.
 Iran: Forbidden for civilians, it is used only by the police. 
 Israel: OC and CS spray cans may be purchased by any member of the public without restriction and carried in public. 
 In the 1980s, a firearms license was required for doing so, but these sprays have since been deregulated.
 Japan: There are no laws against possession or use, but using it could result in imprisonment, depending on the damage caused to the target. 
 Malaysia:  Use and possession of pepper spray for self-defense are legal.
 Mongolia: Possession and use for self-defense are legal, and it is freely available in stores. 
 Pakistan: Possession and use for self-defense is legal and its available at physical and online stores. 
 Philippines: Possession and use for self-defense is legal, and it is freely available in stores.  
 Saudi Arabia: Use and possession of pepper spray for self-defense are legal.
 It is an offense to use pepper spray on anyone for reasons other than self-defense. 
 Singapore: Travellers are prohibited from bringing pepper spray into the country, and it is illegal for the public to possess it.
 South Korea: Pepper sprays containing OC are legal.
 Requires a permit to distribute, own, carry pepper sprays containing pre-compressed gas or explosive propellent.
 Pepper sprays without any pre-compressed gas or explosive propellent are unrestricted. 
 Thailand: Use for self-defense is legal, and it is freely available in stores.
 Possession in a public place can be punished by confiscation and a fine. 
 Taiwan: Legal for self-defense, it is available in some shops.
 It is an offense to use pepper spray on anyone for reasons other than self-defense.  
 Vietnam: Forbidden for civilians and used only by the police.

Europe
 Austria: Pepper spray is classified as a self-defense device, they may be owned and carried by adults without registration or permission. Justified use against humans as self-defense is allowed. 
 Belgium: Pepper spray is classified as a prohibited weapon.
 Possession is illegal for anyone other than police officers, police agents (assistant police officers), security officers of public transport companies, soldiers and customs officers to carry a capsicum spray. It's also authorised after obtaining permission from the Minister of Internal Affairs.
 Czech Republic: Possession and carrying is legal. 
 Police also encourage vulnerable groups like pensioners, children, and women to carry pepper spray.
 Carrying at public demonstrations and into court buildings is illegal (pepper spray as well as other weapons may be left with armed guard upon entry of a courthouse).
 Denmark: Pepper spray is only legal to own with special permission from the police. 
  Finland: Possession of pepper spray requires a license. 
 Licenses are issued for defensive purposes and to individuals working jobs where such a device is needed such as the private security sector. 
France: It is legal for anyone over the age of 18 to buy pepper spray in an armory or military surplus store.
Upon control, it will be confiscated and a verbal warning might be issued.
  Germany: Pepper sprays labeled for the purpose of defense against animals may be owned and carried by all citizens regardless of age. Such sprays are not legally considered as weapons §1. Carrying it at (or on the way to and from) demonstrations may still be punished. 
 Justified use against humans as self-defense is allowed. 
 CS sprays bearing a test mark of the MPA may be owned and carried by anyone over the age of 14.
 Greece: Such items are illegal. They will be confiscated and possession may result in detention and arrest.
 Hungary: Such items are reserved for law enforcement (including civilian members of the auxiliary police).
 Civilians may carry canisters filled with maximum  of any other lachrymatory agent.
 However, there is no restriction for pepper gas pistol cartridges.
 Iceland: Possession of pepper spray is illegal for private citizens. 
 Police officers and customs officers carry it. Coast guardsmen as well as prison officers have access to it. 
 Members of the riot police use larger pepper-spray canisters than what is used by a normal police officer. 
 Ireland: Possession of this spray by persons other the Garda Síochána (national police) is an offence under the Firearms and Offensive Weapons Act.
 Italy: Any citizen over 16 years of age without a criminal record could possess, carry and purchase any OC-based compounds and personal defence devices that respond to the following criteria:
 Containing a payload not exceeding , with a percentage of Oleoresin Capsicum not exceeding 10% and a maximum concentration of capsaicin and capsaicinoid substances not exceeding 2,5%;
 Containing no flammable, corrosive, toxic or carcinogenic substances, and no other aggressive chemical compound than OC itself;
 Being sealed when sold and featuring a safety device against accidental discharge;
 Featuring a range not exceeding .
 Latvia: Pepper spray is classified as a self-defense device. 
 It can be bought and carried by anyone over 16 years of age. 
 Pepper spray handguns can be bought and carried without any license by anyone over 18.
 Lithuania: Classified as D category weapon, but can be bought and carried by anyone over 18 years of age (without registration nor permission).
 Issued as auxilary service device to police.
 Police also encourages vulnerable groups like pensioners or women to carry one.
 Montenegro: It is legal for civilians over the age of 16 to buy, own and carry pepper spray but it is illegal to carry it in a way that it is shown to other people in public spaces or disturb people with it in any way. You are allowed to use it as a self-defense tool if needed.
 Netherlands: It is illegal for civilians to own and carry pepper spray. 
 Only police officers trained in the specific use of pepper spray are allowed to carry and use it against civilians and animals.
 Norway: It is illegal for civilians. 
 Police officers are allowed to carry pepper spray as part of their standard equipment.
 Poland: Called precisely in Polish Penal Code "a hand-held disabling gas thrower", sprays are not considered a weapon.
 They can be carried by anyone without further registration or permission.
 Portugal: Civilians who do not have criminal records are allowed to get police permits to purchase from gun shops, carry, and use OC sprays with a maximum concentration of 5%.
 Romania: Pepper spray is banned at sporting and cultural events, public transportation and entertainment locations (according to Penal Code 2012, art 372, (1), c).
 Russia: It is classified as a self-defense weapon and can be carried by anyone over 18. 
 Use against humans is legal. 
 OC is not the only legal agent used. CS, CR, PAM (МПК), and (rarely) CN are also legal and highly popular.
 Serbia: Pepper spray is legal under the new law as of 2016 and can be carried by anyone over the age of 16. Use against humans in self-defence is legal.
 Slovakia: It is classified as a self-defense weapon.
 It is available to anyone over 18.
 The police recommend its use.
 Spain: Approved pepper spray made with 5% CS is available to anyone older than 18 years.
 Sweden: Requires weapons licence, essentially always illegal to carry in public or private. Issued as supplementary service weapon to police.
 Switzerland: Pepper spray in Switzerland is subject to the Chemicals Legislation. It may only be distributed to buyers above 18 years of age and against ID evidence. Self-service is not permitted and the customer ought to be made aware of safe storage, use and disposal. The vendor needs to possess the "Know-how for the distribution of particularly hazardous chemicals". Potential mailing has to be shipped by registered courier with the remark "to addressee only". The products must be classified and labeled at least an irritant (Xi;R36/37). Regulations for aerosol packages need to be observed. Sprays with greenhouse relevant propellants such as R134a (1,1,1,2-Tetrafluorethan) are banned.  Spray products for self-defense with irritants such as CA, CS, CN, CR are considered as weapons in terms of the gun control law. The weapon purchase permit, as well as the weapon carrier permit, are required for the purchase of such weapons. In 2009, the Swiss Army introduced for the military personnel the irritant atomizer 2000 (RSG-2000) and is introduced during watch functions. The military bearer permit is granted after passing the half-day training.

 United Kingdom: Pepper spray is illegal under Section 5(1)(b) of the Firearms Act 1968: "A person commits an offence if [...] he has in his possession [...] any weapon of whatever description designed or adapted for the discharge of any noxious liquid, gas or other thing."
 Police officers are exempt from this law and permitted to carry pepper spray as part of their standard equipment.

North America

Canada
Pepper spray designed to be used against people is considered a prohibited weapon in Canada. The definition under regulation states "any device designed to be used for the purpose of injuring, immobilizing or otherwise incapacitating any person by the discharge therefrom of (a) tear gas, Mace or other gas, or (b) any liquid, spray, powder or other substance that is capable of injuring, immobilizing or otherwise incapacitating any person" is a prohibited weapon.

Only law enforcement officers may legally carry or possess pepper spray labeled for use on persons. Any similar canister with the labels reading "dog spray" or "bear spray" is regulated under the Pest Control Products Act—while legal to be carried by anyone, it is against the law if its use causes "a risk of imminent death or serious bodily harm to another person" or harming the environment and carries a penalty up to a fine of $500,000 and jail time of maximum 3 years. Carrying bear spray in public, without justification, may also lead to charges under the Criminal Code.

United States
It is a federal offense to carry/ship pepper spray on a commercial airliner or possess it beyond the security metal detectors at the airport. State law and local ordinances regarding possession and use vary across the country. Pepper spray up to 4 Oz is permitted in checked baggage.

When pepper spray is used in the workplace, OSHA requires a pepper spray Safety Data Sheet (SDS) be available to all employees.

Pepper spray can be legally purchased and carried in all 50 states and the District of Columbia. Some states regulate the maximum allowed strength of the pepper spray, age restriction, content and use.

 California: As of January 1, 1996 and as a result of Assembly Bill 830 (Speier), the pepper spray and Mace programs are now deregulated. Consumers will no longer be required to have the training, and a certificate is not required to purchase or possess these items. Pepper spray and Mace are available through gun shops, sporting goods stores, and other business outlets. California Penal Code Section 12400–12460 govern pepper spray use in California. Container holding the defense spray must contain no more than  net weight of aerosol spray.
 Certain individuals are still prohibited from possessing pepper spray, including minors under the age of 16, convicted felons, individuals convicted of certain drug offenses, individuals convicted of assault, and individuals convicted of misusing pepper spray.
 Massachusetts: Before July 1, 2014, residents may purchase defense sprays only from licensed Firearms Dealers in that state, and must hold a valid Firearms Identification Card (FID) or License to Carry Firearms (LTC) to purchase or to possess outside of one's own private property. New legislations allow residents to purchase pepper spray without a Firearms Identification Card starting July 1.
Furthermore, any such pepper spray is classified as "self-defense chemical spray" and therefore not considered a weapon under Florida law.
 Michigan: Allows "reasonable use" of spray containing not more than 18% oleoresin capsicum to protect "a person or property under circumstances that would justify the person's use of physical force". It is illegal to distribute a "self-defense spray" to a person under 18 years of age.
 New York: Can be legally possessed by any person age 18 or over. Restricted to no more than 0.67% capsaicin content.
 It must be purchased in person (i.e., cannot be purchased by mail-order or internet sale) either at a pharmacy or from a licensed firearm retailer (NY Penal Law 265.20 14) and the seller must keep a record of purchases. 
 The use of pepper spray to prevent a public official from performing his/her official duties is a class-E felony.

 New Jersey: Non-felons over the age of 18 can possess a small amount of pepper spray, with no more than three-quarters of an ounce of chemical substance.
Texas law makes it legal for an individual to possess a small, commercially sold container of pepper spray for personal self-defense. However, Texas law otherwise makes it illegal to carry a "Chemical dispensing device".
 Virginia: Code of Virginia § 18.2-312. Illegal use of tear gas, phosgene, and other gases.  "If any person maliciously releases or cause or procure to be released in any private home, place of business or place of public gathering any tear gas, mustard gas, phosgene gas or other noxious or nauseating gases or mixtures of chemicals designed to, and capable of, producing vile or injurious or nauseating odors or gases, and bodily injury results to any person from such gas or odor, the offending person shall be guilty of a Class 3 felony.  If such act be done unlawfully, but not maliciously, the offending person shall be guilty of a Class 6 felony.  Nothing herein contained shall prevent the use of tear gas or other gases by police officers or other peace officers in the proper performance of their duties, or by any person or persons in the protection of the person, life or property."
 Washington: Persons over 18 may carry personal-protection spray devices. 
 Persons over age 14 may carry personal-protection spray devices with their legal guardian's consent.
 Wisconsin: Tear gas is not permissible. 
Further, the product cannot be camouflaged and must have a safety feature designed to prevent accidental discharge.
 In addition there are certain labeling and packaging requirements, it must not be sold to anyone under 18 and the phone number of the manufacturer has to be on the label. The units must also be sold in sealed tamper-proof packages.

South America
 Brazil: Classified as a weapon by Federal Act n° 3665/2000 (Regulation for Fiscalization of Controlled Products). Only law enforcement officers and private security agents with a recognized Less Lethal Weapons training certificate can carry it. 
 Colombia: Can be sold without any kind of restriction to anyone older than 14 years. 
 Use has not been inducted on the law enforcement officer's arsenal.

Australia
 Australian Capital Territory: Pepper spray is a "prohibited weapon", making it an offence to possess or use it.
 New South Wales: Possession of pepper spray by unauthorized persons is illegal, under schedule 1 of the Weapons Prohibition Act 1998, being classified as a "prohibited weapon". 
 Northern Territory: Prescribed by regulation to be a prohibited weapon under the Weapons Control Act. 
 This legislation makes it an offense for someone without a permit, normally anyone who is not an officer of Police/Correctional Services/Customs/Defence, to carry a prohibited weapon.
 Tasmania: Possession of pepper spray by unauthorized persons is illegal, under an amendment of the Police Offences Act 1935, being classified as an "offensive weapon". Likewise, possession of knives, batons, and any other instrument that may be considered, "Offensive Weapons" if they are possessed by an individual, in a Public Place, "Without lawful excuse", leading to confusion within the police force over what constitutes "lawful excuse". Self-defense as a lawful excuse to carry such items varies from one officer to the next. 
 Pepper spray is commercially available without a license. Authority to possess and use Oleoresin Capsicum devices remains with Tasmania Police Officers (As part of general-issue operational equipment), and Tasmanian Justice Department (H.M. Prisons) Officers.
 South Australia: in South Australia, possession of pepper spray without lawful excuse is illegal.
 Western Australia: The possession of pepper spray by individuals for self-defense subject to a "reasonable excuse" test has been legal in Western Australia following the landmark Supreme Court decision in Hall v Collins [2003] WASCA 74 (4 April 2003).
 Victoria: Schedule 3 of the Control of Weapons Regulations 2011 designates "an article designed or adapted to discharge oleoresin capsicum spray" as a prohibited weapon.
 Queensland: in Queensland, pepper spray is considered an offensive weapon and can not be used for self-defence.

New Zealand
 Classed as a restricted weapon. 
 A permit is required to obtain or carry pepper spray. 
 Front-line police officers have routinely carried pepper spray since 1997. New Zealand Prison Service made OC spray available for use in approved situations in 2013. 
 New Zealand Defence Force Military Police are permitted to carry OC spray under a special agreement due to the nature of their duties.
 The Scoville rating of these sprays are 500,000 (sabre MK9 HVS unit) and 2,000,000 (Sabre, cell buster fog delivery). This was as a result of excessive staff assaults and a two-year trial in ten prisons throughout the country.

Civilian use advocates
In June 2002, West Australian resident Rob Hall was convicted for using a canister of pepper spray to break up an altercation between two guests at his home in Midland. He was sentenced to a good behavior bond and granted a spent conviction order, which he appealed to the Supreme Court. Justice Christine Wheeler ruled in his favor, thereby legalizing pepper spray in the state on a case-by-case basis for those who are able to show a reasonable excuse.

On 14 March 2012, a person dressed entirely in black entered the public gallery of the New South Wales Legislative Council and launched a paper plane into the air in the form of a petition to Police Minister Mike Gallacher calling on the government to allow civilians to carry capsicum spray.

See also
 Mace (spray)
 Offensive weapon
 Defensive weapon

Notes

References

External links

Are guns more effective than pepper spray in an Alaska bear attack?

Chemical weapons
Lachrymatory agents
Riot control agents
Self-defense